The Major Mohit Sharma Rajendra Nagar metro station is located on the Red Line of the Delhi Metro. It is located in the Sahibabad Industrial Area locality of Ghaziabad of Uttar Pradesh. The Rajendra Nagar metro station renamed in honour of the country's fallen hero Ashoka Chakra awardee Major Mohit Sharma.

History
This station was proposed early in 2016 by DMRC under extension of Red line. The project deadline was 30 September 2018, when trials were to be conducted. The final commencement was done on 8 March 2019 and the metro station (including the whole new branch of Red Line) has been opened for all commercial passengers on 9 March 2019, Saturday from 0800 hours.

Station layout

Facilities

Rajendra Nagar metro station is close to the famous local movie theatre, the M4U cinema hall. There is a very famous and a large sweet shop/restaurant, known by its name Bikanerwala. The station will also provide ATM facilities

See also
List of Delhi Metro stations
Transport in Delhi
Delhi Metro Rail Corporation
Delhi Suburban Railway
List of rapid transit systems in India
Delhi Transport Corporation
List of Metro Systems
National Capital Region (India)
Ghaziabad district, Uttar Pradesh

References

External links

 Delhi Metro Rail Corporation Ltd. (Official site)
 Delhi Metro Annual Reports
 
 UrbanRail.Net – descriptions of all metro systems in the world, each with a schematic map showing all stations.

Delhi Metro stations
Railway stations in Ghaziabad district, India
Memorials to Rajendra Prasad